Ernest Arthur George (17 October 1887 – 5 February 1971) was an Australian rules footballer who played with South Melbourne in the Victorian Football League (VFL).

He later played for Brunswick in the VFA.

George is best known for winning the 1913 Stawell Gift off 12½ yards in 12.2secs.

Notes

External links 

1887 births
1971 deaths
Sydney Swans players
Brunswick Football Club players
Stawell Gift winners
Australian rules footballers from Victoria (Australia)